Jennifer Burns was a member of the Arizona House of Representatives for three terms. She represented the 25th District, winning for the first time in November 2002. She won re-election in 2004 and 2006. She lost to Russell Jones during her unsuccessful re-election bid in 2008. Even though she was eligible to run in the 2008 election, she chose not to.

References

Republican Party members of the Arizona House of Representatives
Living people
Women state legislators in Arizona
21st-century American politicians
21st-century American women politicians
Year of birth missing (living people)